Henning Jarnskor (born 15 November 1972) is a retired Faroese football midfielder.

References

1972 births
Living people
Faroese footballers
GÍ Gøta players
Association football midfielders
Faroe Islands international footballers